Ramón Puig (21 August 1929 – 21 August 2016) was a Cuban rower. He competed in the men's coxed four event at the 1948 Summer Olympics.

References

External links
 

1929 births
2016 deaths
Cuban male rowers
Olympic rowers of Cuba
Rowers at the 1948 Summer Olympics
Sportspeople from Santiago de Cuba
20th-century Cuban people
21st-century Cuban people